Garra periyarensis is a species of cyprinid fish in the genus Garra. It is found only in the upstream reaches of Periyar River, in Kerala, India.

References 

Garra
Fish described in 2001